Honiton was a parliamentary constituency centred on the town of Honiton in east Devon, formerly represented in the House of Commons of the Parliament of the United Kingdom.  It sent members intermittently from 1300, consistently from 1640. It elected two Members of Parliament (MPs) until it was abolished in 1868.  It was recreated in 1885 as a single-member constituency.

For the 1997 general election, the town of Honiton was added to the neighbouring constituency of Tiverton to form the Tiverton & Honiton constituency. The remainder continued as the East Devon constituency.

Honiton was regarded as a potwalloper borough by the time of Thomas Cochrane. It was notorious for the bribes demanded by its electors, and was therefore a very expensive seat for a candidate to seek election in. The Yonge family of Colyton, patrons of the borough, were almost ruined by representing Honiton on several occasions.  Sir William Pole, 4th Baronet (1678–1741) who had twice represented Honiton at great personal financial expense, made an "earnest request and recommendation" in his will that his son would "never stand as a candidate or if chosen will never be prevailed upon to represent or serve in Parliament for the borough of Honiton".



History

Boundaries
1885–1918: The Sessional Divisions of Axminster, Honiton, Ottery, and Woodbury.

1918–1974: The Borough of Honiton, the Urban Districts of Axminster, Budleigh Salterton, Exmouth, Ottery St Mary, Seaton, and Sidmouth, the Rural Districts of Axminster and Honiton, and part of the Rural District of St Thomas.

1974–1983: The Borough of Honiton, the Urban Districts of Budleigh Salterton, Exmouth, Ottery St Mary, Seaton, and Sidmouth, the Rural Districts of Axminster and Honiton, and part of the Rural District of St Thomas.

1983–1997: The District of East Devon wards of Axminster Hamlets, Axminster Town, Beer, Budleigh Salterton, Colyton, Edenvale, Exmouth Brixington, Exmouth Halsdon, Exmouth Littleham Rural, Exmouth Littleham Urban, Exmouth Withycombe Raleigh, Exmouth Withycombe Urban, Honiton St Michael's, Honiton St Paul's, Lympstone, Newbridges, Newton Poppleford and Harpford, Otterhead, Patteson, Raleigh, Seaton, Sidmouth Rural, Sidmouth Town, Sidmouth Woolbrook, Trinity, Upper Axe, Woodbury, and Yarty.

Members of Parliament

Honiton re-enfranchised by Parliament in Nov 1640

MPs 1640–1660
Long Parliament
 1640-1643: William Poole (Royalist) - disabled to sit, June 1643
 1640-1648: Walter Yonge (Parliamentarian) - not recorded as sitting after Pride's Purge, December 1648; died December 1649
 1645(?)-1648: Charles Vaughan - excluded in Pride's Purge, December 1648

Honiton was unrepresented in the Barebones Parliament.

First Protectorate Parliament
 1654: John Yonge

Second Protectorate Parliament
 1656:  Samuel Serle

Third Protectorate Parliament
 1659: Walter Yonge (grandson of the Member from 1640 -1648)
 1659: Samuel Serle

Long Parliament (restored)
 1659-1660: Not represented

MPs 1660–1868

MPs 1885–1997

Election results

Elections in the 1830s

  

  

  

  

  
  

  

  

Elections in the 1840s

  

  

Elections in the 1850s

  

 
  

 

Elections in the 1860s
Locke's death caused a by-election.

 

Goldsmid's death caused a by-election.

In 1868, the seat was absorbed into East Devon. It was later recreated for 1885.

Elections in the 1880s 

Elections in the 1890s 

Elections in the 1900s 

Elections in the 1910s General Election 1914–15:

Another General Election was required to take place before the end of 1915. The political parties had been making preparations for an election to take place and by the July 1914, the following candidates had been selected; Unionist: Clive Morrison-BellLiberal: 

 Elections in the 1920s 

 Elections in the 1930s 

 Elections in the 1940s General Election 1939–40:
Another General Election was required to take place before the end of 1940. The political parties had been making preparations for an election to take place from 1939 and by the end of this year, the following candidates had been selected; Conservative: Cedric DreweLabour''': J White

Elections in the 1950s

Elections in the 1960s

Elections in the 1970s

Elections in the 1980s

Elections in the 1990s

See also
 List of parliamentary constituencies in Devon

Notes and references

Parliamentary constituencies in Devon (historic)
Constituencies of the Parliament of the United Kingdom disestablished in 1868
Constituencies of the Parliament of the United Kingdom established in 1885
Constituencies of the Parliament of the United Kingdom disestablished in 1997
Rotten boroughs
Honiton